Jean-Pierre Juneau (born April 24, 1945, in Quebec City, Quebec) is a Canadian former diplomat. He retired in 2010 after serving as the Canadian ambassador to Cuba. Prior to taking up his last position in 2007, he was his country's ambassador to the North Atlantic Treaty Organization, Brazil, the European Union and Spain. 

Juneau earned a B.A. in political science and a M.A. in political science – international relations from Laval University. He graduated from the Banff School of Advanced Management in 1984.

References

1945 births
French Quebecers
Living people
People from Quebec City
Ambassadors of Canada to the European Union
Ambassadors of Canada to Cuba
Permanent Representatives of Canada to NATO
Ambassadors of Canada to Brazil
Ambassadors of Canada to Spain